() is a Brazilian political drama television series created by José Padilha and Elena Soarez, directed by Padilha, Felipe Prado, and Marcos Prado, and written by Elena Soarez. The show depicts Operation Car Wash, an ongoing police taskforce that discovered a widespread corruption scheme involving the Brazilian government and several prominent engineering firms. The series premiered all episodes of the first season March 23, 2018, worldwide, on Netflix.

On May 28, 2018, the series was renewed for a second season. The second season premiered on Netflix on May 10, 2019.

Plot
Marco Ruffo (Selton Mello) is a Federal Police delegate obsessed with the case he is investigating. When he least expects it, he and his apprentice, Verena Cardoni (Carol Abras), are already immersed in one of the largest diversion and money laundering investigations in Brazilian history. The proportion is so great that the course of investigations completely changes the lives of all involved.

Cast
 Selton Mello as Marco Ruffo
 Caroline Abras as Verena Cardoni
 Enrique Díaz as Roberto Ibrahim
 Leonardo Medeiros as João Pedro Rangel
 Alessandra Colassanti as Wilma Kitano
 Jonathan Haagensen as Vander
 Otto Jr. as Judge Paulo Rigo
  as Regina
  as Dimas
 Lee Taylor as Claudio Amadeu

Production

Development
In April 2016, Netflix announced that it would produce an original, still untitled series that would follow the investigations of Operation Car Wash. The series was produced by José Padilha, Marcos Prado and the production company Zazen Produções and written by Elena Soarez and Sofia Maldonado. The series was directed by José Padilha, Felipe Prado, Marcos Prado and Daniel Rezende.

Filming
The Mechanism started its production in May 2017. Filming locations included the cities of São Paulo, Rio de Janeiro, Curitiba and Brasília.

Reception 
The first season of the series hold a approval rate of 80% in the review aggregator Rotten Tomatoes based on 10 ratings.

Cassio Starling, in a criticism for Folha de S. Paulo, said that "As was clear from both " Elite Squad ", in addition to the box office success, Padilha seeks to provoke social responses, make the public react to anesthesia and automatic slogans .The enormous attention focused on Lava Jato, on the effects of investigations on the present and the immediate future of the country, could not escape the opportunism of Padilha. Therefore, “The Mechanism” developed little by little, almost insidiously, another plot, which justifies after all, the title. By introducing this fundamental question Padilha reaches a dimension, in fact, more political and less police, more daily and less exceptional. "

Fábio de Souza Gomes, from Omelete, wrote that the program presents tiring fiction, unnecessary parallel plots, but has outstanding performances. He also commented that "although it doesn't seem a little forced, [Selton] Mello improves a lot throughout the series and manages to lead the story well in the shadows while [Caroline] Abras creates a complex and strong detective who seeks to find the corruption behind the country "He added that" The Mechanism could have been much better than it actually was. "

Adolfo Molina, from  Observatório do Cinema, summarizes that "The Mechanism is a failure as a representation of historical facts in Brazil for trying to seek exemption from the bias and failing, and a work of fiction also fails to fall into this trap."

Ritter Fan, from Plano Crítico, wrote that "The scripts of the episodes, all written by Elena Soarez, are beyond didactic, with endless repetitions that hit the same monkkey practically every chapter like" fighting cancer does not leave anyone unscathed And things like that. In the field of performances, Selton Mello once again shows that he is one of the best Brazilian actors of his generation, even considering his irritating inability to speak out, his trademark since the beginning that makes understanding what he babble quite complicated. " He praised Enrique Díaz, saying that the performance "immediately resembled that of Robert Knepper as T-Bag, in Prison Break, that is, a rascal and rascal shaped to make us hate him, but at the same time we love him." He concluded by saying that "The Mechanism is a series with potential, but that it is not fully realized."

Similarities with real life events
Despite the recurrent disclaimer at the start of each episode, declaring the screenplay is loosely based on a true story, with characters and events adapted for dramatic effect, many characters and companies depicted (but not all facts regarding them) can be easily traced to the actual people and companies involved in Operation Car Wash. Some such associations are:

Episodes

Season 1 (2018)

Season 2 (2019)

Awards and nominations

References

External links
 
 

2010s Brazilian television series
2010s drama television series
2018 Brazilian television series debuts
Brazilian drama television series
Portuguese-language Netflix original programming
Political drama television series
Television shows set in Brasília
Television shows set in Curitiba
Television shows set in Rio de Janeiro (city)
Television shows set in Paraguay
Television shows set in São Paulo